Fabio Finocchiaro (born June 6, 1939) is an Italian chess player who holds the ICCF title of Correspondence Chess Grandmaster.

Biography
He started to play chess at age 15 in his native Sicily. Since 1968 Finocchiaro actively participated in the correspondence chess tournaments. In 1977 and 1979 he twice won Italian correspondence chess championship. In 2013 Finocchiaro won the 25th World Correspondence Chess Championship (2009–2013).

References

External links
 
 

1939 births
Living people
World Correspondence Chess Champions
Correspondence chess grandmasters
Italian chess players